NewSchool of Architecture & Design (NewSchool,NSAD ) is a private for-profit college in San Diego that focuses on architecture and design. It is accredited by the WASC Senior College and University Commission (WSCUC).

NewSchool comprises two schools: The School of Architecture and Construction Management houses the undergraduate and graduate architecture and construction management programs while the School of Design at NewSchool offers undergraduate design degrees. The school is accredited by the National Architectural Accrediting Board (NAAB) and offers Bachelor of Architecture (B.Arch), Master of Architecture (M.Arch).

NewSchool is owned by Ambow Education Holding of the Cayman Islands and Beijing, People's Republic of China.

History
Richard P. Welsh founded NewSchool of Architecture in 1980. The school was originally located in Chula Vista, California. In 1988, NewSchool relocated to downtown San Diego. A year later, Bislin Education Corp. (a subsidiary of Futures in Education, Inc.) acquired NewSchool. In 2001, ForeFront Education, Inc., acquired the school and changed its name to NewSchool of Architecture & Design. NewSchool was primarily focused on architecture and construction management undergraduate and graduate degree programs.

Growth
In 2008 Laureate Education acquired NewSchool. Laureate's global network of design schools helped form a collaboration between NewSchool and Domus Academy School of Design in Milan, Italy. The collaboration lead to the creation of the Domus Academy School of Design at NewSchool which introduced several new design degrees including Interior Architecture & Design, Product Design, Design Studies and Media Design.

In 2014, NewSchool was granted regional accreditation by the Western Association of Schools and Colleges, (WASC) Senior College and University Commission (SCUC).

In 2016, the schools partnered to launch a Global Design degree where students study two years in Milan and two years in San Diego. In the same year, Marvin J. Malecha, FAIA, DPACSA, became President and Chief Academic Officer. Malecha was a fellow in the American Institute of Architects, where he served as national president in 2009. Marvin Malecha passed away in May 2020.

In 2020, the NewSchool Board of Directors appointed Denise DeZolt, Ph.D. as the Interim President & Chief Academic Officer of NewSchool of Architecture & Design. In the first quarter of 2020, the NewSchool Board of Directors and its parent Laureate Education, Inc. agreed to the transfer of ownership of NewSchool to Ambow NSAD, Inc., a U.S. subsidiary of Ambow Education Holding, Ltd. of the Cayman Islands and Beijing, People's Republic of China. Later that year, the NewSchool Board of Directors appointed Dr. Tom Clawson, former Chair of the NewSchool Board of Directors, as Interim President & Chief Academic Officer of NSAD.

Decline

Since 2020 NewSchool has gone through one president and four interim presidents. In 2022, NSAD received a Notice of Concern letter from WASC, its accreditor. According to the letter, the accreditor had concerns about the school's finances, leadership, and dwindling enrollment. The school is on Heightened Cash Monitoring by the US Department of Education.

Academics

Architecture programs
 Bachelor of Architecture, First Professional Degree: The Bachelor of Architecture degree program prepares students for an internship in an architectural firm and for eventual licensing as an architect. This degree program is accredited by the National Architectural Accrediting Board (NAAB) and is typically completed in five academic years of full-time study.
 Bachelor of Arts in Architecture: The Bachelor of Arts in Architecture program prepares students to enter a Master of Architecture program or pursue other professional degrees. The program emphasizes the foundations of design from technical and aesthetic perspectives. The program is typically completed in four academic years of full-time study.
 Master of Architecture, First Professional Degree: The Master of Architecture degree program leads to a first professional degree and is fully accredited by the National Architectural Accrediting Board (NAAB). Admission to the program requires a baccalaureate degree in any field. The program is typically completed in two to three academic years of full-time study.
 Master of Architectural Studies: The Master of Architectural Studies degree program is designed for students who want to pursue a career in teaching architecture. The program provides students with a deeper understanding of design principles and theory for students who do not plan to pursue architectural licensing. Admission to the program requires a baccalaureate degree in any field. The program is typically completed in one academic year of full-time study.
 Master of Science in Architecture: The Master of Science in Architecture degree program is intended for students who are interested in focused architectural research in Neuroscience for Architecture or Healthy Urbanism. The program is typically completed in one academic year of full-time study.
 Master of Architecture - IPAL: In 2015, NewSchool was one of the first 14 programs in the United States accepted for participation in the National Council of Architectural Registration Boards (NCARB) Integrated Path to Architectural Licensure (IPAL) initiative. NewSchool offers a 4-year accredited program that makes it possible for students to earn their architectural licensure upon graduation.

Construction Management programs
 Bachelor of Science in Construction Management: The Bachelor of Science in Construction Management degree program is based on an interdisciplinary curriculum of science, architecture and engineering. The program is typically completed in four years of full-time study. Student teams have won first place in the Associated Schools of Construction Competition (ASC) in Reno in 2013, 2015 and 2016.
 Master of Construction Management: The Master of Construction Management degree program emphasizes business management skills and the integration of construction technology with management, business planning, and professional ethics. The program can be completed in one year of full-time study, depending on individual progress.

Design programs
 Bachelor of Interior Architecture & Design.
 Bachelor of Arts in Product Design.
 Bachelor of Science in Graphic Design & Interactive Media.

Campus

The main building is on F Street and Park Boulevard. Faculty and staff occupy the buildings on G Street and Park Boulevard.

Accreditation
Institutional Accreditation: Western Association of Schools and Colleges (WASC) Senior College and University Commission

Programmatic Accreditation: National Architectural Accrediting Board (NAAB)
 Bachelor of Architecture
 Master of Architecture

Student outcomes
According to the College Scorecard, NewSchool's graduation rate is 64 percent. Median earnings for graduates is $54,000. Median total debt after graduation is $32,985.

Ambow Education Holding Ltd.
Ambow Education Holding Ltd is a Cayman Islands corporation and China-based corporation that also owns Bay State College.

Ambow liquidated its assets in 2013 and reorganized the company.

According to Ambow Education's financial reports, the People's Republic of China (PRC) government "exerts substantial influence" over their business.

See also
List of for-profit universities and colleges
For-profit colleges in the United States

References

External links 

 Official website
 Ambow Education Holding

Architecture schools in California
For-profit universities and colleges in the United States
Education in San Diego
Educational institutions established in 1980
1980 establishments in California
Private universities and colleges in California